Sand Gap is an unincorporated community in Freeman Township, Pope County, Arkansas, United States. Sand Gap is located at the junction of Arkansas highways 7 and 16.

Sand Gap used to be known as Grand Gap and Pelsor. It contains Archeological Site 3PP614, which is listed on the National Register of Historic Places.

References

Unincorporated communities in Pope County, Arkansas
Unincorporated communities in Arkansas